The Wood County Monitor is a weekly newspaper serving Wood County, Texas.  In  , newspaper operations of the Mineola Monitor and the Wood County Democrat were merged by their owner, Bluebonnet Publishing, to form the Wood County Monitor.

History

Mineola Monitor

The Mineola Monitor was a newspaper in Mineola, Texas serving Wood County, Texas and the communities of Alba, Golden, Hawkins and parts of unincorporated Wood County. In  the Monitor was purchased by J.A. Thomas.

Wood County Democrat
The newspaper's original site included a Vaughan Ideal hand-operated presses.

The newspaper's main objective upon its founding was the opposition of Populism. Prior to that, Padon had been publisher of the Mineola Monitor.  Quitman businessmen approached him about founding a newspaper in the county seat.

He later assumed ownership and sold a half interest in the plant to Earl Jones in 1901, but later repurchased it. In , Clyde Jordan of Alba purchased an interest in the paper, but eventually Thomas again regained full ownership.

Merger
Prior to the merger, the Mineola Monitor operated under its own masthead in Mineola, and the Wood County Democrat operated under its own masthead in Quitman.  Staffing at the newspapers did not change, and the staff of both newspapers were merged.

References

External links

Weekly newspapers published in Texas
Mass media in Wood County, Texas
Mineola, Texas
1893 establishments in Texas